Automatik Statik is the seventh studio album by American hip hop musician Del the Funky Homosapien. It was released in 2009, for an unfixed rate with a minimum of $3.

Track listing

References

External links
 

2009 albums
Del the Funky Homosapien albums